Jawahar Navodaya Vidyalaya, Wayanad, locally known as JNV Lakkidi, is a boarding, co-educational school in Wayanad district of Kerala state in India. Navodaya Vidyalayas are funded by the Indian Ministry of Human Resources Development and administered  by Navodaya Vidyalaya Smiti, an autonomous body under the ministry.

History 
This school was established on 22 June 2005, and is a part of Jawahar Navodaya Vidyalaya schools. Initially the school operated in renovated godowns of North Malabar District Cooperative and Marketing Society till 31 May 2009. On 1 June 2009, the vidyalaya shifted to the permanent campus which is located at village Lakkidi, Wayanad district. This school is administered and monitored by the Hyderabad regional office of Navodaya Vidyalaya Smiti.

Admission 
Admission to JNV Wayanad at class VI level is made through selection test conducted by Navodaya Vidyalaya Smiti. The information about test is disseminated and advertised in the district by the office of Wayanad district magistrate (Collector), who is also the chairperson of Vidyalya Management Committee.

Affiliations 
JNV Wayanad is affiliated to Central Board of Secondary Education with affiliation number 940014, following the curriculum prescribed by CBSE.

See also 

 List of JNV schools
 List of Kendriya Vidyalayas
 Odisha Adarsha Vidyalaya - Emulation of the Navodaya Vidyalaya system

References

External links 

 Official Website of JNV Wayanad

High schools and secondary schools in Kerala
Wayanad
Educational institutions established in 2005
2005 establishments in Kerala
Wayanad district